Safety in Numbers is a 1930 American pre-Code musical comedy film. Directed by Victor Schertzinger, it stars Charles "Buddy" Rogers, and features Kathryn Crawford, Josephine Dunn, and Carole Lombard (in an  early role).

Plot
William Reynolds is set to inherit $350 million on his next birthday, but his uncle says he must learn the ways of the world beforehand. His uncle hires three follies girls to guide William around New York.

Cast
Charles "Buddy" Rogers as William Butler Reynolds
Kathryn Crawford as Jacqueline
Josephine Dunn as 	Maxine
Carole Lombard as Pauline
Roscoe Karns as Bertram Shapiro
Richard Tucker as F. Carstair Reynolds
Francis McDonald as Phil Kemptom
Raoul Paoli as Jules
Virginia Bruce as Alma McGregor
Geneva Mitchell as Cleo Carewe
Louise Beavers as Messalina
Lawrence Grant as Commander Brinker (uncredited)
Tom London as Motorist (uncredited)
Russ Powell as Doorman (uncredited)
Charles Sullivan as Taxicab Driver (uncredited)

Reception
The reviewer for the Motion Picture Herald wrote, "Here's that rare combination of intelligent direction, brilliant dialogue, and rich humor. The result is a picture that is entertainment plus." Mordaunt Hall of The New York Times was less enthusiastic, but praised the musical numbers.

References

External links

 

1930 musical comedy films
Paramount Pictures films
American musical comedy films
Films directed by Victor Schertzinger
American black-and-white films
1930 films
1930s English-language films
1930s American films